is a private university in Aoba-ku, Sendai, Miyagi, Japan.

History
The Miyagi Girls' School was founded by the Reformed Church in the United States in Japan with the assistance of missionaries Masayoshi Oshikawa and William Edwin Hoy in 1886. It was expanded into a high school in 1911, and chartered as a university in 1946.

Organization

Undergraduate
Faculty of Arts
Department of English
Japanese Literature Department
Department of Human Culture
Psychology Department of Behavioral Sciences
Music department
Food and Nutrition Department
Life and Culture Department of Design
Department of clinical development
International Culture Department
Children's Department of Education

Graduate
Humanities Graduate School of Humanities
English, Department of English and American Literature
Japanese Language and Literature Department
Human Culture Department
Life and Culture Design Department
Health and Nutrition Studies

Alumni 
 Toshiko Abe - politician
 Sayaka Ando - gravure idol

References

External links
 Official website 

Educational institutions established in 1886
Christian universities and colleges in Japan
Private universities and colleges in Japan
Universities and colleges in Miyagi Prefecture
Women's universities and colleges in Japan
Buildings and structures in Sendai
1886 establishments in Japan